55 Arietis is a single star in the northern zodiac constellation of Aries. 55 Arietis is the Flamsteed designation. It is faintly visible to the naked eye as a dim, blue-white hued point of light with an apparent visual magnitude of 5.72. Eggen (1995) listed it as a proper motion candidate for membership in the IC 2391 supercluster. It may be a runaway star, having a peculiar velocity of  relative to its neighbors.

The spectrum of this star matches a B-type giant with a stellar classification of B8 III. It has a high rate of spin, showing a projected rotational velocity of 196 km/s. The star has 4.1 times the mass of the Sun but 9.5 times the Sun's radius. It is radiating 326 times as much luminosity as the Sun from its photosphere at an effective temperature of 7,961 K.

References

External links
 HR 944
 Image 55 Arietis

B-type giants
Aries (constellation)
Durchmusterung objects
Arietis, 55
019548
014677
0944